Maria Elena Brewer is an American diplomat who has served as the United States Ambassador to Lesotho since March 2022. She previously served as the United States Ambassador to Sierra Leone from 2017 to 2021.

Early life and education
Brewer grew up in Northwest Indiana. She graduated from Valparaiso University with a Bachelor of Arts in international economics and cultural affairs in 1995. She also has an Master of Science from National Defense University.

Career
Brewer has been a career Foreign Service Officer for the United States since 1996. She has held posts in Lagos, Nigeria; Freetown, Sierra Leone; Mumbai, India; Islamabad, Pakistan; and Colombo, Sri Lanka. She held several senior leadership positions with the United States Department of State, including serving as Deputy Director of the Career Development and Assignments Division of the Bureau of Human Resources.

Ambassador to Sierra Leone
On July 13, 2017, President Donald Trump nominated Brewer to be the next United States Ambassador to Sierra Leone. Hearings were held on her nomination in the Senate Foreign Relations Committee on July 26, 2017. On August 3, 2017, the committee favorably reported her nomination to the Senate floor. Brewer was confirmed by the United States Senate by voice vote the same day. She left her post in February 2021.

Ambassador to Lesotho
On April 15, 2021, President Joe Biden nominated Brewer to be the next United States Ambassador to Lesotho. The Senate Foreign Relations Committee held hearings on her nomination on June 9, 2021. The committee reported her favorably to the Senate floor on June 24, 2021. On December 18, 2021, the entire United States Senate confirmed her nomination by voice vote. On March 10, 2022, she presented her credentials to King Letsie III.

Personal life
Brewer speaks Spanish, Krio and Hindi.

References

External links
 Biography at U.S. Embassy in Sierra Leone

Living people
21st-century American diplomats
21st-century American women
Ambassadors of the United States to Lesotho
Ambassadors of the United States to Sierra Leone
American women ambassadors
National Defense University alumni
United States Foreign Service personnel
Valparaiso University alumni
Year of birth missing (living people)
American women diplomats